Men at Large is the self-titled debut album by R&B group Men at Large released by East West Records on June 18, 1992.

Track listing
 "Where's Dave And Jason" (Skit Intro)
 "Use Me" - (version #1) 
 "You Me"
 "Would You Like to Dance (With Me)"
 "Um Um Good"
 "Heartbeat"
 "So Alone"
 "Salty Dog"
 "Stay the Night"
 "Ain't It Grand"
 "Use Me" - (version #2) 
 "Menz At Larges" (Skit Outro)

Credits
Men At Large: David L. Tolliver, Jason L. Champion (rap, background vocals).
Additional personnel: Michael Calhoun (guitar); Marc Gordon, Edwin Nicholas Robert Cunningham (keyboards, drums, programming, sequencing); Jim Salamone, Pete Tokar (programming, sequencing); Joe Little III (background vocals).
Producers: Gerald Levert, Marc Gordon, Robert Cunningham, Edwin Nicholas.
Recorded at Midtown Recording Studio, Cleveland, Ohio, and Digital Tekniques Studio, Philadelphia, Pennsylvania.

References

1992 debut albums
East West Records albums
Men at Large albums